Mount Pemigewasset, or Indian Head, is a mountain in Franconia Notch in the White Mountains in Grafton County, New Hampshire. It lies near the town of Lincoln.

The mountain is known for the distinctive cliff along the southern side of its summit, which resembles the profile of a Native American head. Such shapes are formed when water enters cracks in the granite. Over time, the water freezes and expands, which further shapes and cracks the rock.

The head shape has been noted since the early 19th century. It was partly hidden by trees near the chin, but a 1901 forest fire revealed the full profile. The mountain received more attention after a better-known rock formation in the White Mountains, the Old Man of the Mountain, collapsed in 2003. The "Indian Head" will eventually lose its shape as well.

Pemigewasset is an Abenaki Indian word, meaning "rapidly moving", and it also names the nearby Pemigewasset River. The Native American Pemigewasset tribe lived in the area in the 17th and 18th centuries, and a legend of the Abenaki people tells that Chief Pemigewasset spied for enemies from the top of the mountain.

According to an 1898 guidebook, "The view on a moonlight night from the top of this vast cliff is awe inspiring." The Indian Head Resort, a more than one hundred year-old tourist facility, has a view over the mountain as well as a viewing tower.

References

External links
Mount Pemigewasset at  Peakbagger.com, a mountain information site
Mount Pemigewasset (Indian Head) at summitpost.org, a mountaineering website
Hiking Mt Pemigewasset - Indian Head (New Hampshire), video

Mountains of New Hampshire
White Mountains (New Hampshire)
Rock formations of New Hampshire
Landforms of Grafton County, New Hampshire
Tourist attractions in Grafton County, New Hampshire
Abenaki